The Nana Trophy is a tournament for professional female tennis players played on outdoor clay courts. The event is classified as a $25,000 ITF Women's Circuit tournament and has been held in Tunis, Tunisia, annually, since 2012. The event was a $60,000 tournament from 2015 to 2017.

Past finals

Singles

Doubles

External links 
 ITF search

ITF Women's World Tennis Tour
Clay court tennis tournaments
Tennis tournaments in Tunisia
Recurring sporting events established in 2012
Spring (season) events in Tunisia